Miss Mary may refer to:
 Miss Mary (1957 film), an Indian film
 Miss Mary (1972 film), an Indian film
 Miss Mary (1986 film), an Argentine-American film
 Miss Mary case, popular denomination of Hamilton v. Alabama (1964)
 "Miss Mary", a song by Zucchero from the album Miserere